El Sereno Open Space Preserve is a park unit of the Midpeninsula Regional Open Space District located on the peak and slopes of 2580 ft. El Sereno mountain, a peak in the Santa Cruz Mountains.  The preserve is located in Santa Clara County, California.

Location
The city of Monte Sereno, California is named after El Sereno mountain.  A portion of the city is built on the foothills of the mountain.  El Sereno mountain is paired with El Sombroso mountain on each side of Los Gatos, California.

Geology
The San Andreas Fault runs in the valley immediately to the south of the mountain.  The Berrocal fault zone runs under the mountain's northern slope.  A small, unnamed fault runs in the small valley that leads down to Canon Dr.

Views
The preserve offers visitors views of Silicon Valley, Los Gatos, California and Lexington Reservoir.  The Monterey peninsula can be seen in the distance.

Trails
Limited parking is available at the end of Montevina Rd.  The Montevina Ridge Trail from there connects to the Aquinas Trail.  The Serenity Trail goes to the base of a power pole overlooking Lexington Reservoir. The Overlook Trail is accessed at the end of Overlook Drive.

Cougar habitat

El Sereno mountain is a habitat for the Cougar.  Signs at the entrance to the preserve warn visitors.

References

External links
 Map of El Sereno Open Space Preserve
 Photos from El Sereno Open Space Preserve
 Mountain biking page about the preserve
 USGS Map of the Sargent-Berrocal fault zone

Parks in Santa Clara County, California
Midpeninsula Regional Open Space District
Nature reserves in California
Santa Cruz Mountains
Parks in the San Francisco Bay Area
Bay Area Ridge Trail